Voh or VOH may refer to:
 Voh, a commune in the North Province of New Caledonia
 Voh River, a river of New Caledonia
 Vohemar Airport, the IATA code VOH
 Verband Österreichischer Höhlenforscher (VÖH), a national caving organization